Carlos Ramón Juan Bombal Otaegui (born 1 November 1950) is a Chilean politician.

He is the nephew of the writer María Luisa Bombal.

References

External links
BCN Profile

1950 births
Living people
20th-century Chilean politicians
Pontifical Catholic University of Chile alumni
Independent Democratic Union politicians
Mayors of places in Chile
Members of the Chamber of Deputies of Chile
Members of the Senate of Chile
People from Colchagua Province